Igatpuri Assembly constituency is one of the 288 Vidhan Sabha in Indian state of Maharashtra.  Vidhan Sabha or the legislative assembly, is the lower house (in states with bicameral) or the sole house (in unicameral states) of the provincial (state) legislature in the different states of India.

Members of assembly
1982: Satish kashinathseth Sharma 
2004: Kashinath Mengal, Shiv Sena
2009: Nirmala Manikrao Gavit, Congress
2014: Nirmala Manikrao Gavit, congress
2019: Hiraman Bhika Khoskar, congress

References

Assembly constituencies of Nashik district
Assembly constituencies of Maharashtra